Clement Vann Rogers (January 11, 1839 – October 28, 1911) was an American politician and judge in Indian Territory. Clem Rogers' parents were both mixed-blood Cherokees who moved to Indian Territory in 1832, several years before the Trail of Tears. Before the American Civil War, Clem allied with the "Treaty Party", a Cherokee faction that supported signing the Treaty of New Echota. When the Civil War broke out, Clem enlisted in the Confederate Army, and served under General Stand Watie. After the war, he became active in Cherokee politics, first elected as a judge in the Cooweescoowee District, then served five terms in the Cherokee Senate. He later served as a delegate to the Oklahoma Constitutional Convention. Rogers was the father of entertainer Will Rogers.

When Oklahoma became a state in 1907, the former Cherokee Districts were dissolved and replaced by new counties. One of the counties created from the former Cooweescoowee District, Rogers County, Oklahoma, was named in honor of Clement Rogers.

Family lineage
Clement Vann Rogers's parents, Robert Rogers, Jr., (1815–1842) and Sallie Vann (1818–1882), "came from Georgia before the main removal of the Cherokees in 1838." Sallie Vann was a sister of David Vann, who was related to the Cherokee chief James Vann.

Clem's grandfather was Robert Rogers Sr., a Scotch-Irish immigrant and trader, who came to the area now known as West Virginia in 1800. Settling there, he married a half-Cherokee woman named Lucy Cordery. Their first son was Robert, Jr., who was born in 1815. This son married Sallie Vann in 1835. Sallie was also from a mixed-blood family, and said to be three-eights Cherokee. Robert Rogers, Sr. was apparently deceased before 1830, when the U.S. Congress passed the Indian Removal Act. By then, Robert Sr.'s widow, her son, Robert, and his two sisters were living in Georgia. After a group of mostly mixed-blood Cherokees signed the Treaty of New Echota in 1830, they decided that migrating west was inevitable and moved in 1832 to a tract of land near the boundary of Arkansas Territory and Indian Territory. After Robert and Sallie built a two-story, five-room house near the community of Westville, in the Goingsnake District of Indian Territory. Robert established a prosperous farm in the new land, and their first child, Margaret, was born there in 1836. Their son, Clement Vann, familiarly known as "Clem", was born January 11, 1839.

Early life
Clem exhibited a disdain for formal education. Although his mother pushed him into attending school, she had to stand in the road when he left the house and make sure he followed the path to school, rather than going in a different direction. He first attended a Baptist missionary school, about a mile from his home. Then went to the Cherokee Male Seminary in Talequah, but soon dropped out to work as a hand on a ranch owned by Joel M. Bryan. On May 15, 1855, Clem and 15 other cowboys began to drive 500 longhorn steers to sell in Kansas City. They found no buyers there, so continued the drive to St. Louis, an additional . The journey took four months and proved Clem's endurance and tenacity.

Marriage and family
Never lacking self-confidence or ambition, Clem decided to establish his own ranch. First, he had to persuade his mother and stepfather to give him twenty-five cows, a bull, four horses, and two slaves, Rabb and Houston, who had belonged to his father. In 1856, Clem and his entourage moved west until they came to a tributary of the Caney River, west of the present town of Talala, Oklahoma. In 1858, Clem Rogers married Mary America Schrimsher. Clem had met Mary while he was attending school in Talequah. They shared some important characteristics. Both were born in 1839 in the Cherokee Nation West (after their parents moved to Indian Territory from Arkansas), both were of mixed blood. Clem and Mary were very different in some other respects. Mary's black hair, broad face and narrow cheekbones emphasized her Indian ancestry. Clem looked more European because he had sandy hair, blue eyes and a bushy mustache. He was taciturn and had a gruff nature, while she was said to be vivacious, sweet and funny, as well as an excellent musician and dancer. He was indifferent about religion, while she was a devout Methodist. Despite their differences, they remained a devoted couple.

The Schrimsher and Rogers families have been called part of the "Cherokee elite". They were English-speaking, mixed-blood, relatively affluent slave owners who had relatively large farms or plantations, and who had adopted many "civilized" practices, such as sending their children to white or at least missionary schools. Many of this group were not adamantly opposed to moving west, when the white government in Washington, D. C. pressured them to do so. This group became the nucleus of what would become known as the "Treaty Party". The large majority of Cherokees were full-bloods, unable to speak English, non-slaveholders, subsistence farmers, clung to traditional ways of living, chose not to intermarry with whites and adamantly opposed to the idea of giving up their homeland in the Southeast to move across the Mississippi River. Often called the "Conservatives", they lined up with Principal Chief John Ross and his National party which controlled the tribal government before removal.

Civil War
When the American Civil War broke out, Clem, like a majority of the mixed-blood Cherokees, favored the faction of Cherokees that supported the Confederates. At first, Chief John Ross tried to keep the tribe neutral, but many of his full-blood followers privately supported the Union. Soon his ranch was raided by a party of Jayhawkers, and ran off all his cattle. Clem enlisted as an officer in the Confederate Army unit led by Stand Watie.

"Clem became associated with the brilliant Cherokee leader, William Penn Adair", and named his son William Penn Adair Rogers after him.
Clem served as a member of the Cherokee Senate during the years 1862–63.
In 1891 Clem was President of the Cherokee Livestock Association.
"Clem's political activities began in 1877 when he ran successful as Judge of the Cooweescoowee District ... . He was Senator from his district five terms for the following years : 1879, 1881, 1883, 1899, 1903."
"In 1890 he was President of the Vinita Fair Board .... In 1894 ... Clem Rogers became Vice President of the First National Bank of Claremore, a position he held until his death in 1911." "In 1899, he was elected President of the Claremore School Board.... That part of his beloved Cooweescoowee District where he lived was re-named "Rogers County" in his honor."

Personal life
Children:
Elizabeth Rogers (1861–1862)
Sally Clementine Rogers (1863–1943)
Maude Ethel Rogers (1869–1925)
May Rogers (1873–1909)
Will Rogers (1879–1935)

Notes

References

Bibliography
 Paula McSpadden Love : "Clement Vann Rogers 1839–1911". In :- The Chronicles of Oklahoma, Vol. XLVIII (1970), pp. 389–399.
 Arthur Frank Wertheim and Barbara Blair, editors. The Papers of Will Rogers: The Early Years.Volume I. November 1879 – April 1904. University of Oklahoma Press. Norman and London. .

1839 births
1911 deaths
19th-century American politicians
20th-century Native Americans
Cherokee Confederates
Cherokee Nation businesspeople
Cherokee Nation politicians (1794–1907)
Cherokee slave owners
Confederate States Army soldiers
People from Westville, Oklahoma
School board members in Oklahoma
Vann family (Georgia)